A by-election was held for the New South Wales Legislative Assembly electorate of Northumberland on 30 April 1880 because Thomas Hungerford resigned attend to personal business matters.

Dates

Candidates

 Joseph Creer was a cabinet maker and Newcastle councillor. This was his first candidacy for the Legislative Assembly.

 Sir William Gordon was a surgeon from Murrurundi. This was his tenth and final time standing unsuccessfully for the Legislative Assembly.

 George Maclean was a free selector. He had previously stood unsuccessfully for the Liverpool Plains by-election in 1876.

 Ninian Melville was chairman of the Working Men's Defence Association and campaigned on a platform of protectionism and opposition to assisted immigration. He had twice been defeated for East Sydney in 1877 at the by-election in August and the general election in October.

Result

Thomas Hungerford resigned.

See also
Electoral results for the district of Northumberland
List of New South Wales state by-elections

References

1880 elections in Australia
New South Wales state by-elections
1880s in New South Wales